Al Green (born 1946) is an American musician.

Al or Alexander Green or Greene may also refer to:

Al Green (basketball) (born 1953), Australian basketball player
Al Green (politician) (Alexander N. Green, born 1947), Congressman from Texas
Al Green (record producer), American record producer
Al Green (wrestler) (Alfred Dobalo, 1955–2013), American professional wrestler of the 1990s
Alexander Green (executioner), Australian hangman
Alexander Henry Green (1832–1896), English geologist
Alexander M. S. Green, Scottish lawyer
Al Denney, professional wrestler of the 1960s and 1970s who used the ringname Al Greene
Al Greene (baseball) (1954–2014), baseball player for the Detroit Tigers
Al Greene (footballer) (born 1978), Gibraltarian footballer

See also
Alvin Greene (born 1977), US Senate Candidate in South Carolina
Alan Green (disambiguation)
Albert Green (disambiguation)